Gymea may refer to:

Gymea, New South Wales, a suburb of Sydney, Australia
Gymea Bay, New South Wales, an adjacent suburb
the Gymea Lily, a flowing plant indigenous to coastal New South Wales